Mohamad Adam Shreen bin Tambi or previously Shreen anak Tambi (born 22 February 1993) is a Malaysian footballer who plays midfielder for Kuching City in the Malaysia Premier League.

References

External links
 

1993 births
Living people
Malaysian footballers
Sarawak FA players
Sarawak United FC players
Kuching City F.C. players
Malaysia Premier League players
Malaysia Super League players
Association football defenders
Association football midfielders